Invisible Hands Music is a UK-based independent record label.

The label is owned and run entirely by Charles Kennedy who started out by self-releasing cassettes sold at gigs by his first band 'Night World' in 1987. The first CD release was Fretwork Southeast, a compilation album of local bands from Southwest London in 1993. After three more CDs in the series, and an eponymous debut album by Kennedy's alias The Aries Project, the label moved into signing legacy artists starting with Wishbone Ash, and singer-songwriter, Rob Reynolds. Other releases in the 1990s, distributed by Pinnacle in the UK, included electro compilations such as Speed Garage Invasion and Drum n Bass Invasion.

After a gap of five years, the label restarted operations in Camden Town in January 2003, releasing niche cash-in products such as a box set of Emerson, Lake & Palmer remixes by Mike Bennett, a box set of Wishbone Ash demos, and a compilation of covers of David Bowie songs. Hazel O'Connor joined the label with a reissue series of her 1990s albums. Releases included music by guitarist Stevie Salas, Silver Sun (two studio albums), Hugh Cornwell (two studio albums and a live set) and Thomas Dolby (live CD / DVD box set).

In 2008 Invisible Hands signed a partially-reformed lineup of The Jam (sans Paul Weller), and released a new Hugh Cornwell album, Hooverdam, available as a free download.

After a four-year hiatus between 2010 and 2014, the label restarted operations in London's West End, rereleasing The Aries Project's eponymous album under the new title "English Ghosts".

Other artists and releases:
 Miranda Lee Richards – Echoes of the Dreamtime 
 Tangerine Dream – Out of this World (Limited edition numbered, double transparent tangerine coloured vinyl)
 Hugh Cornwell – The Fall and Rise of Hugh Cornwell
 Libera – Beyond (2018), Hope (2017), Libera at Christmas (2016)
 Mishka Shubaly – Cowards Path

The above 5 releases were half-speed mastered at Abbey Road studios by Miles Showell.

Releases for 2016 were by Animotion, Crosby & Nash, Superdrone (flexi-disk project), REM, Pearl Jam and James Taylor.

Catalogue

ALBUMS
 IH1 Night World Invisible Hands (cassette)
 IH2 Night World The Bears at the End of the Garden (cassette)
 IH3 Night World Grand Designs (cassette)
 IH4 Night World Charge of the Night Brigade (cassette)
 IHCD5 Various Fretwork Southeast
 IHCD6 The Aries Project The Aries Project later reissued as English Ghosts
 IHCD7 Various Fretwork Southeast 2: The Crossing
 IHCD8 Rob Reynolds Waiting for the Tide
 IHCD9 Various Fretwork 3: Upshot
 IHCD10 Various Fretwork 4: Electronic
 IHCD11 Night World Atmospheres
 IHCD12 Wishbone Ash Trance Visionary
 IHCD14 Various Drum & Bass Invasion
 IHCD15 Various Speed Garage Invasion
 IHCD16 Various Diamond Gods: Interpretations of Bowie
 IHCD17 Rob Reynolds Samsara Never Sleeps
 IHCD18 Hazel O'Connor Beyond The Breaking Glass
 IHCD19 Hazel O'Connor Live in Berlin
 IHCD20 Hazel O'Connor 5 In The Morning
 IHCD21 Hazel O'Connor Acoustically Yours
 IHCD22 Rob Reynolds Sightseeing
 IHCD23 Emerson, Lake & Palmer Reworks: Brain Salad Perjury (3-CD box set)
 IHCD24 Wishbone Ash Wonderful Stash (3-CD box set)
 IHCD25 Ade Payne My Town
 IHCD26 Clear Coming Round
 IHCD27 Whysome Not Even Close To What It Was Meant To Be (IR01)
 IHCD28 UK Subs Staffordshire Bull
 IHCD29 The Vibrators Live: Near The Seedy Mill Golf Club
 IHCD30 Cheap & Nasty Cool Talk Injection
 IHCD31 Hazel O'Connor A Singular Collection: The Best of Hazel O'Connor
 IHCD32 Cormac De Barra Barco
 IHCD33 Mick Karn More Better Different
 IHCD34 Forest Giants In Sequence
 IHCD35 Silver Sun Disappear Here
 IHCD36 Rob Reynolds Live in Den Haag
 IHCD37 Hazel O'Connor Hidden Heart
 IHCD38 Hugh Cornwell Beyond Elysian Fields
 IHCD39 Stevie Salas The Sun & The Earth: The Essential Stevie Salas Vol. 1
 IHCD40 Various Northern Line: The British At NXNE
 IHCD41 Rob Reynolds The Curious World
 IHCD42 Silver Sun Dad's Weird Dream
 IHCD43 Hugh Cornwell Dirty Dozen
 IHCD44 Hugh Cornwell People, Places, Pieces (3-CD box set)
 IHCD45 Various Lost & Found
 IHCD49 Birds of Wales Fall of the 49 EP
 IHCD50 Various Contemporary Formation
 IHCD51 Thomas Dolby The Sole Inhabitant (CD and DVD box set)
 IHCD52 Hugh Cornwell Hooverdam (CD and DVD box set; vinyl)
 IHCD53 From The Jam A First Class Return (DVD box set)
 IHCD59 Dave Bartram "Lost and Found"
 IHCD60 Mishka Shubaly "Cowards Path"
 IHCD61 Hugh Cornwell "The Fall and Rise of Hugh Cornwell"
 IHCD62 Animotion "Raise Your Expectations"
 IHCD63 Miranda Lee Richards "Echoes of The Dreamtime"
 IH65 Tangerine Dream "Out of this World"
 IH66 Rush "Timeless Wavelength"
 IH67 Crosby & Nash "Wind on the Water"
 IHCD68 Dorje "Centred And One"
 IH69 Tangerine Dream "Quantum Key"
 IH72 Tangerine Dream "Particles"
 IHCD73 Libera "Libera At Christmas"
 IH74 Miranda Lee Richards "Existential Beast"
 IH75 Libera "Hope"
 IH76 Superdrone "Superdrone One"
 IH78 The Jive Aces "Just For The Record"
 IH79 Thorsten Quaeschning "Cargo (original soundtrack recording)"
 IH80T Tangerine Dream "Run To Vegas / Leviathan" (Record Store Day 2018 EP)
 IH82 Superdrone "Superdrone Two"
 IH83 Tangerine Dream "Sessions I"
 IHD89 Superdrone "Starcade"

N/A The Aries Project Echo Park / Ionisphere Blue / Up / Underpass

SINGLES
 IHSCD4 The Aries Project Shelter, Medina, Stateless
 IHSCD5 Rob Reynolds Stormy Weather
 IHSCD6 Rob Reynolds Take It Easy
 IHST7 Wishbone Ash Heritage (12" vinyl)
 IHCDS10 Clear Johnny Marr Was A Mistake
 IHCDS11 Rob Reynolds Sweet Mother
 IHCDS12 OK Cola Everybody Wants To Be A DJ*
 IHS14 Forest Giants Postcards (7" vinyl)
 IHCDS15 Clear Over And Over
 IHCDS16 Rob Reynolds Heaven Knows
 IHCDS17 The Kates EP (CD and 12" vinyl)
 IHCDS19 Hazel O'Connor One More Try
 IHCDS20 The Kates Suicide Valentine
 IHCDS21 Junk TV	Oh England
 IHCDS22 Rob Reynolds Sweet Mother
 IHCDS23 Silver Sun Bubblegum
 IHCDS25 Rob Reynolds Heaven Knows
 IHCDS26 Hazel O'Connor Perfect Days
 IHCDS27 Silver Sun Immediate
 IHCDS28 Hugh Cornwell Under Her Spell
 IHCDS29 Hazel O'Connor I'll See You Again/ Hidden
 IH80T Tangerine Dream "Run To Vegas / Leviathan" (Record Store Day 2018 EP)
 IHCDFREEME1 Rob Reynolds Free Me

VIDEO (promo only)
  VHS Rob Reynolds Stormy Weather
  VHS Rob Reynolds Take It Easy
  VHS Rob Reynolds Sweet Mother
  VHS Clear Johnny Marr Was A Mistake
  VHS Hazel O'Connor One More Try
  VHS Mick Karn The Jump
  DVD Various IHM Artists
  DVD Hugh Cornwell Live in London

RELATED ALBUMS
  Hugh Cornwell Live: Live It & Breathe It (HISCD004)
  David Fisher Firehorse
  Manana Fast Days EP

COMPILATIONS
  Exposed (In Yer Face Records IYF-01CD) includes Night World Remote
  Future Sounds Of Underground Garage (Intrinsic Records TOYCD008) includes Night World Grass Roots and DJ Aries In Awe Of Stratus Girl
  United Flava Of Drum n Bass: The Junglist Jazz Selection (Intrinsic Records TOYCD1006) includes Fledgling feat DJ Tyrone and The Aries Project Baby Jane
  Definitive Underground Drum n Bass (Ration-L RALVP002CD) includes The Aries Project New Foundations (Fledgling's Incision Mix)
  Seminal Excursions In Underground Garage: 40 Crucial Cuts (Ration-L RALVP007CD) includes DJ Aries feat Mikey Davenport Sitting All Alone
  The British At Midem 2004 includes Rob Reynolds Sweet Mother
  The British At Midem 2005 includes Rob Reynolds Sweet Mother
  The British At Midem 2007 includes Silver Sun Fallen
 The British At Popkomm 2005 includes Rob Reynolds Sweet Mother
  The British At Popkomm 2007 includes Thomas Dolby I Live In A Suitcase
  AIM For China 2004
  AIM For America 2006 includes Silver Sun, Rob Reynolds, Hugh Cornwell
  BPI UK Indie Synch Sampler November 2005 includes Rob Reynolds Change My World

References

External links

Record labels established in 1987
British independent record labels
Experimental music record labels
Pop record labels
Rock record labels
1987 establishments in the United Kingdom